V is the third studio album by Swedish indie pop band JJ. It was announced by Secretly Canadian on May 29, 2014 and was released on August 19, 2014 in collaboration with Sincerely Yours. The album was made available for streaming through NPR on August 4, two weeks before the release date.

A music video for the song "All White Everything" was released on June 11, 2014. The music video was directed by Olivia Kastebring and featured the band members inside a mental hospital.

Track listing

References

2014 albums
JJ (Swedish band) albums
Secretly Canadian albums